This is a list of districts of Botswana by Human Development Index as of 2021.

References 

Botswana
Human Development Index
Governorates by Human Development Index